A keel is the central beam of the hull of a boat.

Keel may also refer to:
 Keel (anatomy), several meanings

Boats
 Humber Keel, a type of boat used on the Humber Estuary in England
 Keelboat or "keel", a flat-bottomed boat designed for use on rivers

Biology
 Keel (bird anatomy), modified sternums of birds

Art, entertainment and media 
 Keel (band), heavy metal group in the 1980s
 Keel (album)
 KEEL, AM radio station in Shreveport, Louisiana
 Keel Lorenz, a character in Neon Genesis Evangelion

Places 
 Keel, County Mayo, town on Achill Island, Ireland
 Keel, a parish of Castlemaine, County Kerry, Ireland
 Keel Creek Bridge, a road bridge near Coalgate, Oklahoma, USA
 Keel Island, an island off the Antarctica coast
 Keel Mountain (disambiguation)

Other uses
 Keel (surname), including a list of people with the name

 Keel (unit), a measure of coal in North East England
 Studio Keel, Serbian swimwear company specializing in water polo

See also 

Keels (disambiguation)
Keal (disambiguation)
Keeill
Keele (disambiguation)
Kiel (disambiguation)
Kil (disambiguation)
Kile (disambiguation)
Kill (disambiguation)
Kyl (disambiguation)
Kyle (disambiguation)
Kyll